Andorra competed at the 2012 Summer Paralympics in London, United Kingdom from August 29 to September 9, 2012.  Andorra was represented by one athlete, swimmer Antonio Sanchez Francisco, who did make it to the finals.

Swimming

See also

 Andorra at the 2012 Summer Olympics

References

Nations at the 2012 Summer Paralympics
2012
2012 in Andorran sport